Mickley Green is a hamlet in Suffolk, United Kingdom to the east of the village of Whepstead on the road to Melon Green.

Hamlets in Suffolk
Borough of St Edmundsbury